Hemigrapsus estellinensis is an extinct species of crab, formerly endemic to the Texas Panhandle. It was discovered by Gordon C. Creel in 1962 and was probably already extinct before his description was published in 1964, after the Estelline Salt Springs where it lived were contained by the United States Army Corps of Engineers. It differed from its relatives by the pattern of spots on its back, and by the relative sizes of its limbs.

Description

Hemigrapsus estellinensis has a rectangular carapace with almost parallel sides. The front corners of the carapace are developed into three strong teeth on each side.

The chief difference between H. estellinensis and other species in the genus is the extensive pattern of rust-red spots on the animal's "drab green" carapace. H. estellinensis also has a pair of conspicuous white spots near the ends of the H–shaped indentation on the animal's back, and another spot between each of those spots and the lateral margin of the carapace. The legs are marked with larger spots than the carapace, and both the chelipeds and the walking legs are shorter than in other species. There are no spots on the animal's underside, including the abdomen. In males, the chelipeds bear a hairy patch containing chemoreceptors on the ventral side of the claw.

Creel collected 6 males and ten females; one of the males is the holotype and all the others are paratypes. All sixteen are held in the National Museum of Natural History as specimens USNM 107855 and USNM 107856. A few living specimens were taken to Wayland College (now Wayland Baptist University), but died within 17 hours for unknown reasons. Two of the females laid eggs before dying, one laying 3,000 and the other 8,000.

Distribution and ecology

H. estellinensis lived in Estelline Salt Springs east of the town of Estelline in Hall County, Texas,  from the nearest ocean. Before its extinction, it was the only troglobitic crab in the contiguous United States. Its occurrence so far from the ocean has been described as "curious", and the species was "probably a Pleistocene relic".

The springs originally produced water with a salinity of 43‰ that fed the Prairie Dog Town Fork of the Red River. The salinity derives from Permian red beds, and has a strong structuring effect on the Red River's biota.

Before it was contained, the spring had a rich biota, comprising the cyanobacteria Oscillatoria and Lyngbya, the green algae Ulva clathrata and U. intestinalis, twenty species of diatom, many invertebrates – including a species of barnacle – and a single fish species, Cyprinodon rubrofluviatilis. The springs have since increased in salinity, and many species have been driven to extinction, including H. estellinensis and the undescribed barnacle. As early as December 1962, attempts to find further living individuals of H. estellinensis were unsuccessful, and it was probably extinct before Creel's description was published in 1964.

The closest relative of H. estellinensis is the shore crab Hemigrapsus oregonensis, which lives along the coast of the Pacific Ocean. The entire genus is restricted to the Pacific Ocean, except for Hemigrapsus affinis which lives along the Atlantic coasts of South America, from Cape San Roque (Rio Grande do Norte state, Brazil) to the Gulf of San Matías (Patagonia, Argentina), and population of Hemigrapsus sanguineus which have been introduced from the species' native range in East Asia to the Atlantic coast of the United States from Portland, Maine to North Carolina, and to the English Channel and North Sea.

References

External links

Estelline Salt Springs: 

Grapsoidea
Extinct crustaceans
Endemic fauna of Texas
Crustaceans of the United States
Freshwater crustaceans of North America
Extinct animals of the United States
Extinct invertebrates since 1500
Species made extinct by human activities
Crustaceans described in 1964
Pleistocene animals of North America
Pleistocene first appearances